Burnside was an electoral district of the House of Assembly in the Australian state of South Australia from 1938 to 1970. Before 1938 the Burnside area was represented by the three-seat multi-member electorate of Sturt. It was abolished in the 1970 parliamentary reforms, and was replaced with Bragg.

Burnside was one of just three metropolitan seats (with Mitcham and Torrens) won by the Liberal and Country League in 1965 and 1968.

Members

Election results

References 

S.A. Former members 

Former electoral districts of South Australia
1938 establishments in Australia
1970 disestablishments in Australia
Constituencies established in 1938
Constituencies disestablished in 1970